Spangle is a city in Spokane County, Washington, United States. The population was 278 at the 2010 census.  The name comes from William Spangle, an early pioneer.

History
Spangle was first settled in 1872 by William Spangle. Later that same year, Spangle's two children planted a tree, marking the settlement of their new community. They affectionally named the tree "Branchy." To this day Branchy stands tall in the center of town. The townsite was platted in 1879.  It was incorporated in 1888.

Geography
Spangle is located at  (47.430641, -117.377083).

Spangle is 18 miles south of Downtown Spokane along US Route 195, an important north–south highway. The highway used to run through town, however a re-alignment of 195 by-passed it and several other small towns. The old highway is still open between Spangle and Rosalia, 14 miles (23 km) to the south, offering an alternate route. The city is surrounded by the rolling farmland of the Palouse.

Demographics

2010 census
As of the census of 2010, there were 278 people, 118 households, and 74 families living in the city. The racial makeup of the city was 97.5% White, 1.4% Native American, 0.4% Asian, 0.4% from other races, and 0.4% from two or more races. Hispanic or Latino of any race were 0.4% of the population.

There were 118 households, of which 30.5% had children under the age of 18 living with them, 49.2% were married couples living together, 5.1% had a female householder with no husband present, 8.5% had a male householder with no wife present, and 37.3% were non-families. 30.5% of all households were made up of individuals, and 12.7% had someone living alone who was 65 years of age or older. The average household size was 2.36 and the average family size was 2.97.

The median age in the city was 40.8 years. 21.9% of residents were under the age of 18; 9.4% were between the ages of 18 and 24; 24.2% were from 25 to 44; 24.8% were from 45 to 64; and 19.8% were 65 years of age or older. The gender makeup of the city was 51.1% male and 48.9% female.

2000 census
As of the census of 2000, there were 240 people, 99 households, and 66 families living in the town. The population density was 625.6 people per square mile (243.9/km2). There were 113 housing units at an average density of 294.6 per square mile (114.8/km2). The racial makeup of the town was 98.33% White, 0.42% Native American, and 1.25% from two or more races. Hispanic or Latino of any race were 2.50% of the population.

There were 99 households, out of which 31.3% had children under the age of 18 living with them, 50.5% were married couples living together, 11.1% had a female householder with no husband present, and 33.3% were non-families. 27.3% of all households were made up of individuals, and 11.1% had someone living alone who was 65 years of age or older. The average household size was 2.42 and the average family size was 2.94.

In the town the age distribution of the population shows 25.4% under the age of 18, 8.8% from 18 to 24, 26.7% from 25 to 44, 24.2% from 45 to 64, and 15.0% who were 65 years of age or older. The median age was 35 years. For every 100 females, there were 112.4 males. For every 100 females age 18 and over, there were 110.6 males.

The median income for a household in the town was $38,393, and the median income for a family was $40,556. Males had a median income of $31,071 versus $26,250 for females. The per capita income for the town was $17,128. About 10.3% of families and 18.8% of the population were below the poverty line, including 28.3% of those under the age of eighteen and none of those 65 or over.

Education
Spangle is also notable as the home of Upper Columbia Academy and Liberty High School.  Upper Columbia Academy, a boarding high school affiliated with the Seventh-day Adventist Church, is approximately 2 miles southeast of Spangle.  5.5 miles East of Upper Columbia Academy is Liberty High School, a rural school serving the communities of Spangle, Plaza, Fairfield, Mount Hope, Latah, and Waverly.  It is a "B" school that has a total of around 450 students (K-12).

References

Cities in Spokane County, Washington
Cities in Washington (state)